Dundee Dental Hospital is a health facility in Park Place in Dundee, Scotland. It is managed by the University of Dundee and NHS Tayside.

History
The facility has its origins in a dental club formed by the University College of Dundee in 1909. The dental hospital itself was established by Sir George Baxter when he rented to flats in two villas in Park Place in 1914. The hospital joined the National Health Service in 1948. The villas were replaced with a large stone building, designed by Findlay, Stewart & Robbie, on the same site in 1952. An extension in the form of a modern tower block, designed by Robbie & Wellwood, was opened the Queen Elizabeth The Queen Mother in 1968.

References

External links
 NHS Tayside

Hospital buildings completed in 1914
Hospitals in Dundee
NHS Scotland hospitals
Teaching hospitals in Scotland
Hospitals established in 1914
1914 establishments in Scotland